Beaver Dam Lake may refer to:

Lakes
 Beaver Dam Lake (Nova Scotia), Canada
 Beaver Dam Lake (Wisconsin), U.S.
 Beaver Dam Lake, in Beaver Dam State Park (Illinois), U.S

Places
 Beaver Dam Lake, New York

See also

Beaver dam (disambiguation)
Beaver Lake Dam, in Alaska, U.S.
Beaver Lake (Arkansas)#Beaver Dam, U.S.